Aaranyam is a 2015 Indian Tamil-language romantic drama film directed by Guberji and starring Ram and Neeraja.

Cast 
Ram as Arvind
Neeraja as Divya
Shaji Chen as Pandi
Ilavarasu as Kumaresan
Inspector Duraipandi
Singamuthu and Crane Manohar as forest guards

Reception 
Nandita Ravi of The Times of India wrote that "With no script whatsoever, lack-luster performances from the cast, juvenile jokes, music with absolutely no recall value, ​and really bad dialogues, you’d think this film had at least one saving grace to boast of. Sadly, there is none". Sudhir Srinivasan of The Hindu criticised the film as a whole and called the storyline "dated, dreadful and predictable". Malini Mannath of The New Indian Express opined that "Though a laudable first-time effort, the unnecessary humour and an abrupt ending overshadow the better moments of the film". A critic from Dinamalar gave the film a negative review while praising the cinematography. SMK of Nowrunning said that "Apart from few middling performances, there is nothing to root for in Aaranyam, which is a terribly cliched film-making with overflowing banalities and caricatured characters".

References 

2010s Tamil-language films